Matapédia is an album by the Canadian duo Kate & Anna McGarrigle, released in 1996.

Kate's daughter Martha Wainwright appears on the album as a backing vocalist; she is also directly mentioned in the lyrics of the title track.

The title "Matapédia" refers to the river in eastern Quebec that runs down to the town of Matapédia, Quebec, and then out into baie des Chaleurs. The rhythm of the river is supposed to be the inspiration for the loping beat of the album's title track.

The album won the Juno Award for Roots & Traditional Album of the Year - Group at the Juno Awards of 1997.

Critical reception
The Chicago Tribune wrote that the songs "reflect on time's passage with a mixture of haunting ambiguity and bittersweet longing—qualities that have defined the duo's songbook from the beginning." The Los Angeles Times noted that "the old-time folksiness of the McGarrigles' sound is in the foreground once more, carried by fiddles and accordions."

AllMusic wrote that the sisters "return to their strengths by trimming back the synthesizers and sticking with direct, folky testaments."

Track listing
"Matapedia" (Kate McGarrigle) – 4:52
"Goin' Back to Harlan" (Anna McGarrigle) – 4:59
"I Don't Know" (Kate McGarrigle) – 4:28
"Hang Out Your Heart" (Kate & Anna McGarrigle, Philippe Tatartcheff, Chaim Tannenbaum) – 4:27
"Arbre" (Anna McGarrigle, Philippe Tatartcheff) – 3:14
"Jacques et Gilles" (Kate McGarrigle) – 4:27
"Why Must We Die" (Kate & Anna McGarrigle, Joel Zifkin) – 5:32
"Song for Gaby" (Anna McGarrigle) – 2:55
"Talk About It" (Kate & Anna McGarrigle) – 5:50
"The Bike Song" (Anna McGarrigle) – 3:54

Personnel
 Kate McGarrigle - vocals, harmony vocals, chorus, banjo, piano, celeste, synthesizer
 Anna McGarrigle - vocals, harmony vocals, chorus, guitar, keyboards, piano, harpsichord, synthesizer 
 Pierre Marchand - keyboards, accordion, drums, production
 Pat Donaldson - guitar, bass 
 Michel Pépin - guitar, dobro, bass, percussions, backing vocals
 Andrew Cowan - guitar 
 Joel Zifkin - violin, fiddle, backing vocals
 Gilles Losier - violin
 Sylvain Clavet - drums, percussions 
 Mike DiNardo - drums 
 Gordie Adamson - drums
 Lily Lanken - harmony vocals 
 Martha Wainwright - harmony vocals

References

External links
 
 

1996 albums
Kate & Anna McGarrigle albums
Hannibal Records albums
Albums produced by Joe Boyd
Albums produced by Pierre Marchand
Albums recorded at Le Studio
Juno Award for Roots & Traditional Album of the Year – Group albums